Brian Mark Chambers (born 31 October 1949) is an English former professional footballer who played as a midfielder. He played in the Football League for Sunderland, Arsenal, Luton Town, Millwall, AFC Bournemouth and Halifax Town, before moving into non-league football.

Life and career
Chambers was born on 31 October 1949 in Newcastle upon Tyne, where he attended St Mary's RC Boys' Technical School and played football for the school team. He represented Newcastle schools, and in 1965 became an England schoolboy international.

When he left school, he joined Sunderland, and was a member of their 1966–67 FA Youth Cup-winning team. He turned professional with Sunderland in August 1967, and remained with the club for a further six years, scoring 7 goals from 71 appearances in all competitions.

In 1973, Chambers signed for Arsenal for a fee of £30,000.

Honours
Sunderland
FA Youth Cup: 1966–67

References

External links

1949 births
Living people
Footballers from Newcastle upon Tyne
English footballers
England schools international footballers
Association football midfielders
Sunderland A.F.C. players
Arsenal F.C. players
Luton Town F.C. players
Millwall F.C. players
AFC Bournemouth players
Halifax Town A.F.C. players
Poole Town F.C. players
English Football League players